Pilar is a village in Goa, India, some 10 km from the state capital Panaji. It is on a hill top and has a panoramic view of the Arabian Sea and the mountains all around.

Etymology
The village is named after Our Lady of the Pillar (Nuestra Señora del Pilar in Spanish).

Pilar Society
The headquarters of the Missionary Society of St. Francis Xavier is located at Pilar, hence the common name of Pilar Society given to the missionaries of Saint Francis Xavier. [SFX].

There are pilgrims who visit Pilar every Thursday to venerate the mortal remains of venerable Father Agnelo, a priest of the above-said Society who had lived a virtuous life.

The Pre-Novitiate house is doing well in Pilar. They organised an art exhibition there entitled Waves Of Destruction... Waves of Compassion...

Gallery

References 

Villages in North Goa district